The Myths and Legends Byway is a Louisiana Scenic Byway that follows several different state highways, primarily:
LA 111 from Junction to Burr Ferry;
LA 112 from DeRidder to Sugartown;
LA 113 from east of DeRidder to Pitkin;
US 165 and LA 26 from Kinder to DeRidder;
US 171 and LA 10 from DeRidder to Oakdale; and
US 190 from the Texas state line to DeRidder.

References

Louisiana Scenic Byways
Tourist attractions in Allen Parish, Louisiana
Tourist attractions in Beauregard Parish, Louisiana
Tourist attractions in Vernon Parish, Louisiana
Scenic highways in Louisiana